Hauteville-Lompnes is a former commune in the Ain department in eastern France. On 1 January 2019, it was merged into the new commune of Plateau d'Hauteville.

History
The commune was formed in 1942 by the union of Hauteville and Lompnes. In 1964 it absorbed the neighbouring communes of Lacoux and Longecombe.

Sanatorium Félix Mangini
The Sanatorium Félix Mangini was established in 1899 bycFrédéric Dumarest., a former student of Carlo Forlanini. It was dedicated to the care of tuberculosis patients.

Geography
The river Albarine flows southwestward through the commune's northern part.

Population

Features
Hauteville-Lompnes is famous for its deposits of marble which has been used in the construction of many monumental buildings, among them the Empire State Building in New York City and the Kōkyo Imperial Palace in Tokyo.

A notable feature is the castle d'Angeville, a family possession of the family of that name since 1657. A scion of that family was Henriette d'Angeville, the second woman to climb Mont Blanc, for whom a street in Hauteville is named; her brother, the count d'Angeville, lived in the castle in the mid-nineteenth century.

Today the town is more oriented towards tourism, with cross country and downhill skiing in the winter and range of summertime activities, including walking, hiking and fishing.

See also
Communes of the Ain department

References

Former communes of Ain
Ain communes articles needing translation from French Wikipedia
Populated places disestablished in 2019